Stefan de Bod (born 17 November 1996) is a South African cyclist, who currently rides for UCI WorldTeam .

Career
De Bod was born in Worcester, Western Cape and was schooled at Paul Roos Gymnasium, in Stellenbosch. Before joining  in 2019, de Bod had spent three seasons with their development team . In October 2020, he was named in the startlist for the 2020 Vuelta a España.

In November 2020, de Bod signed a two-year contract with the  team, from the 2021 season.

Major results

2014
 1st  Team time trial, African Youth Games
 National Junior Road Championships
1st  Road race
3rd Time trial
 National Junior Track Championships
1st  Scratch
1st  Individual pursuit
2015
 1st  Team pursuit, African Track Championships
 1st 947 Cycle Challenge
 4th PMB Road Classic, KZN Autumn Series
2016
 National Road Championships
1st  Under-23 road race
1st  Under-23 time trial
2nd Road race
2nd Time trial
2017
 National Road Championships
1st  Under-23 road race
1st  Under-23 time trial
2nd Road race
2nd Time trial
 2nd  Time trial, African Road Championships
2018
 National Under-23 Road Championships
1st  Time trial
5th Road race
 1st Gran Premio Palio del Recioto
 2nd Trofeo Alcide Degasperi
 8th Time trial, UCI Under-23 Road World Championships
 8th Piccolo Giro di Lombardia
2019
 1st  Time trial, African Road Championships
 National Road Championships
2nd Time trial
3rd Road race
 3rd Overall Tour of Austria
2020
 2nd Time trial, National Road Championships
2021
 5th Overall Tour de Hongrie
2022
 4th Overall Sibiu Cycling Tour
 4th Overall Okolo Slovenska
 6th Overall Vuelta a Castilla y León
2023
 1st  Time trial, National Road Championships

Grand Tour general classification results timeline

References

External links

1996 births
Living people
South African male cyclists
White South African people
Competitors at the 2019 African Games
African Games competitors for South Africa
Olympic cyclists of South Africa
Cyclists at the 2020 Summer Olympics
People from Worcester, South Africa
Sportspeople from the Western Cape